Crotalocrinites, also known as the feather star, is a genus of extinct sea lily belonging to the family Crotalocrinitidae. These feather stars were stationary intermediate-level organisms feeding on suspension epifauna. They lived in the Silurian period, from the Upper Wenlock age (428.2 ± 1.5 to 422.9 ± 2.8 mya) to the Ludlow age (422.9 ± 1.5 to 418.7 ± 2.8 mya).

Distribution
Devonian of Australia, Kazakhstan, Mongolia. Silurian of Norway, Russia, Ukraine, the United Kingdom, and United States (Illinois, Indiana, Iowa, Wisconsin).

Species
 Crotalocrinites cora
 Crotalocrinites rugosus

References
Biolib
Paleobiology Database
Sepkoski, Jack Sepkoski's Online Genus Database

Silurian animals of Asia
Silurian crinoids